Sarah Fabyan and Alice Marble defeated the defending champions Simonne Mathieu and Billie Yorke in the final, 6–2, 6–3 to win the ladies' doubles tennis title at the 1936 Wimbledon Championships.

Seeds

  Simonne Mathieu /  Billie Yorke (final)
  Sarah Fabyan /  Alice Marble (champions)
  Evelyn Dearman /  Joan Ingram (third round)
  Bobbie Heine Miller /  Margaret Morphew (semifinals)

Draw

Finals

Top half

Section 1

Section 2

Bottom half

Section 3

Section 4

The nationality of Miss M MacTier is unknown.

References

External links

Women's Doubles
Wimbledon Championship by year – Women's doubles
Wimbledon Championships - Doubles
Wimbledon Championships - Doubles